Canyon View High School may refer to:
 Canyon View High School (Arizona) in Waddell, Arizona
 Canyon View High School (Ontario, California)
 Canyon View High School (Cedar City, Utah)
 Canyon View Preparatory Academy in Prescott Valley, Arizona